The Nucleic acid phylogenetic profiling (NAPP) is a database of coding and non-coding sequences according to their pattern of conservation across the other genomes.

See also
 Conserved sequence

References

External links
 http://napp.u-psud.fr/

Computational phylogenetics
Genetics databases